Qezel Qaleh (also Romanized as Qezel Qal‘eh; also known as Qezei Qal‘eh) is a village in Khondab Rural District, in the Central District of Khondab County, Markazi Province, Iran. At the 2006 census, its population was 127, in 25 families.

References 

Populated places in Khondab County